Alfredo Mosca (born 6 December 1971) is a retired Swiss football midfielder.

References

1971 births
Living people
Swiss men's footballers
Swiss Super League players
Étoile Carouge FC players
Association football midfielders